Silver Creek is the name of several different streams, locales, and other features in the U.S. state of Oregon, including:

References

Rivers of Oregon